Mount Berger is a mountain with a steep northern rock face, standing 2 nautical miles (3.7 km) northeast of Mount Becker in the Merrick Mountains, Ellsworth Land. Mapped by United States Geological Survey (USGS) from surveys and U.S. Navy air photos, 1961–67. Named by Advisory Committee on Antarctic Names (US-ACAN) for Lieutenant Commander Raymond E. Berger, U.S. Navy, aircraft pilot who flew the University of Wisconsin Traverse Party to this area and flew support missions in its behalf in the 1965–66 season.

References

Mountains of Ellsworth Land